Xylota flavitibia is a species of hoverfly in the family Syrphidae.

Distribution
Canada, United States.

References

Eristalinae
Insects described in 1884
Diptera of North America
Hoverflies of North America
Taxa named by Jacques-Marie-Frangile Bigot